Adrian "Tripp" Piperi III (born January 20, 1999) is an American male shot putter who won the individual gold medal at the Youth World Championships.  Three years later he won the silver medal, a scant centimeter behind gold at the 2018 World U20 (Junior) Championships.

Competing for The Woodlands High School, he completed an undefeated senior season with the 2017 Texas State Championship in the shot put.  Collegiately he competes for the University of Texas.

References

External links

1999 births
Living people
American male shot putters
Texas Longhorns men's track and field athletes
Track and field athletes from Texas
People from The Woodlands, Texas